The 515th Coast Artillery was a regiment of the United States Army first created in the early 1920s.

It was allotted to the Seventh Corps Area in 1923, and organized in 1924 as part of the Organized Reserves. After the outbreak of the Pacific War on 7 December 1941, a "Provisional 200th CA (AA) Regiment of Manila" was established on 8 December 1941, initially with 20 officers and 500 enlisted men manning anti-aircraft weapons previously stored in the Manila area. The 515th Coast Artillery was then withdrawn 19 December 1941 from the Organized Reserves and allotted to the Regular Army, and the 515th Coast Artillery (Antiaircraft) hastily activated at Fort Stotsenburg near Manila in the Philippine Islands, with the provisional regiment's personnel from the 200th Coast Artillery (AA). The number "515" was taken from an Organized Reserve regiment in Lincoln, Nebraska, organized in 1924, that probably had few personnel assigned. That day the provisional regiment was redesignated as the 515th and augmented with about 750 officers and enlisted men of the Philippine Army for training. It was moved from Manila on 25 December 1941 (the day before Manila was declared an open city) to defend the withdrawal routes to Bataan, where the unit defended the Cabcaben airfield and other key points until surrendering as part of the Philippine Provisional Coast Artillery Brigade on 9 April 1942.

The 515th Coast Artillery (Antiaircraft) was inactivated on 2 April 1946 at Fort Mills, Philippine Islands. The regiment was redesignated on 1 August 1946 as the 515th Coast Artillery Battery and activated at Fort Winfield Scott, California. Inactivated 25 November 1946 at Fort Winfield Scott, California. Headquarters and Headquarters Battery, 515th Antiaircraft Artillery Group, organized and federally recognized on 25 September 1947 at Roswell, New Mexico, moved to Albuquerque in 1955, but then consolidated with a number of other units into the reformed 200th Artillery on 1 September 1959. 

The 515th Support Battalion within the New Mexico Army National Guard now is the heir to the lineage of the 515th CA.

See also
515th Regiment (United States) - New Mexico National Guard regional training institute

References
Footnotes

Sources
 

Coast artillery regiments of the United States Army